Giordana Sorrentino (born 27 April 2000) is an Italian boxer. She competed in the women's flyweight event at the 2020 Summer Olympics held in Tokyo, Japan. She won the gold medal in the women's light flyweight event at the 2022 Mediterranean Games held in Oran, Algeria.

She competed in the bantamweight event at the 2019 AIBA Women's World Boxing Championships held in Ulan-Ude, Russia. She qualified at the 2020 European Boxing Olympic Qualification Tournament to compete at the 2020 Summer Olympics in Tokyo, Japan.

In 2022, she won the gold medal in her event at the European U22 Boxing Championships held in Poreč, Croatia. Two months later, she competed in the light flyweight event at the 2022 IBA Women's World Boxing Championships held in Istanbul, Turkey.

References

External links
 

2000 births
Living people
Italian women boxers
Olympic boxers of Italy
Boxers at the 2020 Summer Olympics
Boxers from Rome
Competitors at the 2022 Mediterranean Games
Mediterranean Games gold medalists for Italy
Mediterranean Games medalists in boxing
21st-century Italian women